The Haggard Ford Swinging Bridge is a historic suspension bridge in Boone County, Arkansas. It has cast-in-place concrete abutments, towers, and anchorages, and is supported by steel cables. A wooden deck, one travel lane in width, is suspended from steel hangers. The bridge was built 1938–41 with funding from the Works Progress Administration. Fill surrounding the abutments was washed away in 1945 and subsequently replaced. The bridge deck was replaced in 1977.

The bridge was listed on the National Register of Historic Places in 1995. It is one of the few surviving historic suspension bridges in the state.

See also
List of bridges documented by the Historic American Engineering Record in Arkansas
List of bridges on the National Register of Historic Places in Arkansas
National Register of Historic Places listings in Boone County, Arkansas

References

External links

Road bridges on the National Register of Historic Places in Arkansas
Bridges completed in 1941
Suspension bridges in the United States
Historic American Engineering Record in Arkansas
National Register of Historic Places in Boone County, Arkansas
Towers in Arkansas
Steel bridges in the United States
Concrete bridges in the United States
1941 establishments in Arkansas
Transportation in Boone County, Arkansas
Swing bridges in the United States
Works Progress Administration in Arkansas